Derodontus maculatus is a species of tooth-necked fungus beetle in the family Derodontidae. It is found in North America. This species adapt in cooler climate regions or areas where colder seasonal changes occur.

References

Further reading

 
 

Derodontidae
Articles created by Qbugbot
Beetles described in 1844